The Laura River is a river located in the Cape York Peninsula region of Far North Queensland, Australia.

Course and features
The Laura River rises on the eastern slopes of the Great Dividing Range below Mount Murray. The river is joined by sixteen tributaries including the Deighton, Little Laura and Mosman rivers. The river descends  over its  course.

The river is crossed by the Mulligan Highway near Mount Gibson.

A railway bridge was built over this river, but because of a change in finances and plans it was never used, except for a test train.

Etymology
The river was named as the Hearn River by William Hann on 19 October 1872, after his wife's family name. The name Laura was given by Archibald Macmillan, a road surveyor and explorer, after his wife, Laura Bower (nee Poingdestre).

See also 

 List of never used railways

References

Rivers of Far North Queensland